Oberhausen is a city on the river Emscher in the Ruhr Area, Germany, located between Duisburg and Essen. The city hosts the International Short Film Festival Oberhausen and its Gasometer Oberhausen is an anchor point of the European Route of Industrial Heritage.

History
Oberhausen was named for its 1847 railway station which had taken its name from the Oberhausen Castle. The new borough was formed in 1862 following inflow of people for the local coal mines and steel mills. Awarded town rights in 1874, Oberhausen absorbed several neighbouring boroughs including Alstaden, parts of Styrum and Dümpten in 1910. Oberhausen became a city in 1901, and they incorporated the towns of Sterkrade and Osterfeld in 1929. The Ruhrchemie AG synthetic oil plant ("Oberhausen-Holten" or "Sterkrade/Holten") was a bombing target of the oil campaign of World War II, and the US forces reached the plant by 4 April 1945.

In 1973, Thyssen AG employed 14,000 people in Oberhausen in the steel industry, but ten years later the number had fallen to 6,000.

In 1954 the city began hosting the International Short Film Festival Oberhausen, and the 1982 Deutscher Filmpreis was awarded to a group that wrote the Oberhausen Manifesto.

Demographics
Population development since 1862:

The age breakdown of the population (2013) is:

There were 12.5% non-Germans living in Oberhausen, as of 2014.

The unemployment rate is 10.4% (Jul 2020).

Migrant communities in Oberhausen as of 31 December 2017:

Politics

Mayor
The current Mayor of Oberhausen is Daniel Schranz of the Christian Democratic Union (CDU), elected in 2015 and re-elected in 2020. The most recent mayoral election was held on 13 September 2020, with a runoff held on 27 September, and the results were as follows:

! rowspan=2 colspan=2| Candidate
! rowspan=2| Party
! colspan=2| First round
! colspan=2| Second round
|-
! Votes
! %
! Votes
! %
|-
| bgcolor=| 
| align=left| Daniel Schranz
| align=left| Christian Democratic Union
| 30,150
| 45.5
| 28,456
| 62.1
|-
| bgcolor=| 
| align=left| Thorsten Berg
| align=left| Social Democratic Party
| 19,699
| 29.7
| 17,381
| 37.9
|-
| bgcolor=| 
| align=left| Norbert Emil Axt
| align=left| Alliance 90/The Greens
| 7,002
| 10.6
|-
| bgcolor=| 
| align=left| Wolfgang Kempkes
| align=left| Alternative for Germany
| 4,521
| 6.8
|-
| bgcolor=| 
| align=left| Jens Carstensen
| align=left| The Left
| 3,095
| 4.7
|-
| 
| align=left| Urban Mülhausen
| align=left| Open for Citizens
| 1,378
| 2.1
|-
| bgcolor=| 
| align=left| Claudia Wädlich
| align=left| The Violets
| 468
| 0.7
|-
! colspan=3| Valid votes
! 66,313
! 98.7
! 45,837
! 99.2
|-
! colspan=3| Invalid votes
! 859
! 1.3
! 368
! 0.8
|-
! colspan=3| Total
! 67,172
! 100.0
! 46,205
! 100.0
|-
! colspan=3| Electorate/voter turnout
! 159,510
! 42.1
! 159,458
! 29.0
|-
| colspan=7| Source: State Returning Officer
|}

City council

The Oberhausen city council governs the city alongside the Mayor. The most recent city council election was held on 13 September 2020, and the results were as follows:

! colspan=2| Party
! Votes
! %
! +/-
! Seats
! +/-
|-
| bgcolor=| 
| align=left| Christian Democratic Union (CDU)
| 21,471
| 32.8
|  0.2
| 19
|  1
|-
| bgcolor=| 
| align=left| Social Democratic Party (SPD)
| 20,754
| 31.7
|  7.2
| 19
|  4
|-
| bgcolor=| 
| align=left| Alliance 90/The Greens (Grüne)
| 9,450
| 14.4
|  5.9
| 8
|  3
|-
| bgcolor=| 
| align=left| Alternative for Germany (AfD)
| 4,995
| 7.6
| New
| 4
| New
|-
| bgcolor=| 
| align=left| The Left (Die Linke)
| 3,367
| 5.1
|  2.8
| 3
|  2
|-
| bgcolor=| 
| align=left| Free Democratic Party (FDP)
| 1,988
| 3.0
|  0.2
| 2
| ±0
|-
| 
| align=left| Alliance of Obenhauser Citizens (BOB)
| 1,913
| 2.9
|  5.7
| 2
|  3
|-
| 
| align=left| Open for Citizens (OfB)
| 1,153
| 1.8
| New
| 1
| New
|-
| colspan=7 bgcolor=lightgrey| 
|-
| bgcolor=| 
| align=left| The Violets (Die Violetten)
| 445
| 0.7
|  0.5
| 0
| ±0
|-
! colspan=2| Valid votes
! 65,536
! 98.1
! 
! 
! 
|-
! colspan=2| Invalid votes
! 1,290
! 1.9
! 
! 
! 
|-
! colspan=2| Total
! 66,826
! 100.0
! 
! 58
!  2
|-
! colspan=2| Electorate/voter turnout
! 159,510
! 41.9
!  0.9
! 
! 
|-
| colspan=7| Source: State Returning Officer
|}

Sport
Oberhausen is home to Regionalliga West football team Rot-Weiß Oberhausen, who play at the Niederrheinstadion situated on the banks of the Rhine–Herne Canal. 

The city had a professional ice hockey team between 1997 and 2007, the Revierlöwen Oberhausen. The team initially played at the Arena Oberhausen when playing in the top-flight Deutsche Eishockey Liga but later moved to the Emscher-Lippe-Halle in Gelsenkirchen following financial woes.

The Rudolf Weber-Arena has hosted many international indoor sporting events including MMA event UFC 122 in 2010  and the PDC Unibet European Championship of darts in 2020.

The city has established itself as a popular destination for professional wrestling in Germany, with Essen-based promotion Westside Xtreme Wrestling (wXw) regularly running shows in Oberhausen's Turbinenhalle.  wXw's 16 Carat Gold Tournament is considered one of the most prestigious independent wrestling tournaments in the world and is held in March every year in Oberhausen - attracting fans from around the world.

Twin towns – sister cities

Oberhausen is twinned with:

 Middlesbrough, England, United Kingdom (1974)
 Zaporizhzhia, Ukraine (1986)
 Freital, Germany (1990)
 Carbonia, Italy (2002)
 Iglesias, Italy (2002)
 Mersin, Turkey (2004)
  Tychy, Polen (2020)

Notable people

Georg Schaltenbrand (1897–1979), author, neurologist and Multiple Sclerosis specialist
Martha Schneider-Bürger (1903–2001), civil engineer and author
Reni Erkens (1909–1987), swimmer
Wilhelm Brinkmann (1910–1991), field handball player
Erich Kempka (1910–1975), SS-officer and Adolf Hitler's driver
Werner Töniges (1910–1995), naval officer
Willy Jürissen (1912–1990), footballer
Édouard Wawrzyniak (1912–1991), French footballer
Will Quadflieg (1914–2003), actor
Alf Marholm (1918–2006), actor, radio plays, audio books and voice
Arnulf Zitelmann (born 1929), writer
Paul Lange (1931–2016), kayaker, Olympic champion
Karl-Heinz Feldkamp (born 1934), football player and trainer
Wilhelm Keim (1934–2018), chemist and professor for technical chemistry
Theo Vennemann (born 1937), linguist and professor of German and theoretical linguistics
Siegfried Jerusalem (born 1940), opera singer
Hans Siemensmeyer (born 1940), football player and coach
Wolf-Dieter Ahlenfelder (1944–2014), football referee
Tilman Spengler (born 1947), writer and journalist, author and co-editor of the magazine Kursbuch
Eckhard Stratmann-Mertens (born 1948), teacher and politician (Alliance 90/The Greens), Member of Bundestag
Ditmar Jakobs (born 1953), footballer
Willi Wülbeck (born 1954), athlete
Achim Hofer (born 1955), musicologist
Christoph Klimke (born 1959), writer
Michael Grosse-Brömer (born 1960), politician (CDU), Member of Bundestag
Christoph Schlingensief (1960–2010), film and theater director, radio play writer and performance artist
Dirk Balthaus (born 1965), jazz pianist and composer
Esther Schweins (born 1970), actress and comedian
Markus Feldhoff (born 1974), footballer
Mark Kleinschmidt (born 1974), rower
Marcel Landers (born 1984), footballer
Max Meyer (born 1995), footballer
Davin Herbrüggen (born 1998), singer

Gallery

References

External links

 
Cities in North Rhine-Westphalia
Oil campaign of World War II
Populated places established in 1862
1862 establishments in Prussia